Regh may refer to:

People
 Anton Regh (1940–2018), German football player
 Bob Regh (1912–1999), American basketball player
  (1887-1955), German politician